Duli (Gewe, Gueve, Gey) is an extinct Adamawa language of northern Cameroon.

Blench (2004) links Duli to the extinct Gey (Gewe) language; Glottolog states that Gey is undemonstrated as a distinct language. Duli and Gewe (Gey) were closely related language varieties, and were probably dialects of the same language according to Kleinewillinghöfer (2015). They were spoken around the confluence of the Benue and Mayo-Kebbi Rivers, and are documented by a word list in Strümpell (1922/23).

Although Boyd (1989:184) had classified Duli as one of the Duru languages, Kleinewillinghöfer finds no evidence of it being a Duru language and treats it as a separate group within the Adamawa–Gur continuum.

Distribution
Today, the Gey, who number about a 1,000 people in the east of Pitoa (Pitoa commune, Bénoué department, North Region), according to the ORSTOM population map of 1964. SIL (1982) estimates the ethnic population as 1,900. The Gey now recognize the Lamido of Tchéboa as their ruler, and they currently speak only Fulfulde.

Duli is spoken near Pitoa (Pitoa commune) and Garoua (Bénoué department, North Region). Eldridge Mohammadou also notes that only a few Duli words had been collected. As a result, the language is essentially undocumented.

References

Roger Blench, 2004. List of Adamawa languages (ms)

Duru languages
Languages of Nigeria
Languages of Cameroon
Extinct languages of Africa